Blackwing is the name of two supervillains and one hero appearing in American comic books published by Marvel Comics.

A 1940s version of Joseph Manfredi appeared in the second season of the Marvel Cinematic Universe television series Agent Carter, portrayed by Ken Marino.

Publication history

The first Blackwing appeared in Daredevil #118 and was created by Gerry Conway and Don Heck.

Fictional character biography

Joseph Manfredi

Joseph Manfredi was born in Orlando, Florida, and is the son of the crime lord Silvermane. When he debuted, he was a costumed animal trainer for the Ringmaster's Circus of Crime. While as a member of that group, he battled with Daredevil and escaped.

Blackwing worked as an agent for Silvermane's HYDRA (serving as the Air Action Division Leader) when his father was leader. He participated in the capture of Foggy Nelson. Blackwing battled Daredevil, Black Widow, Nick Fury, and S.H.I.E.L.D. and was once again defeated by Daredevil.

Blackwing later teamed up with Jack O'Lantern to stake out his father's house when the Red Skull took the control of the base, turning the dilapidated mansion into his so-called Skull House. The duo searched Skullhouse and battled Captain America during this event. Blackwing and Jack O'Lantern were recruited by Mother Night to join the Skeleton Crew after the Red Skull was impressed with their abilities. Blackwing, Jack O'Lantern, and Cutthroat fought Crossbones and Diamondback before they joined the Skeleton Crew. Blackwing captured Diamondback, and then battled Diamondback as she escaped. He and the rest of the Skeleton Crew were defeated by Captain America, Diamondback, and Falcon. He was defeated in combat by Falcon, and taken to the Vault.

The second Crimson Cowl recruited Blackwing to join her incarnation of the Masters of Evil. He was defeated alongside them.

After that last defeat, Joseph abandoned the Blackwing identity and became a crime lord creating his own private villains in Heavy Mettle. He ordered Firestrike to bring him the battle suit of New Warriors member Turbo in hopes of proving himself to his father and the other crime bosses of New York. The New Warriors defeated Joseph's group and Firestrike is currently in the Witness Protection Program in exchange for his testimony against Joseph Manfredi.

Heavy Mettle version
A member of Joseph Manfredi's group Heavy Mettle also goes by the name of Blackwing.

During the Dark Reign storyline, this Blackwing is shown as a new member of Norman Osborn's Shadow Initiative. She was later injured during the attempt to retake 42, the Negative Zone Prison, from Blastaar's forces. She was killed in action.

Barnell Bohusk

Powers and abilities
The first Blackwing is an expert trainer of bats, with which he has a highly developed empathic rapport. He has a number of specially mutated bats bred for abnormal strength, size, and intelligence. Blackwing wears a costume consisting of synthetic stretch fabric over chain mail body armor. Devices in his costume give him the power of flight for short distances, via directed motion hovering. Blackwing is also a skilled marksman.

The second Blackwing wears an armored suit that has wings enabling her to fly.

Other versions
In the pages of the Old Man Logan finale "Dead Man Logan", Joseph Manfredi is shown to be older and residing in Florida where he answers to Lizard. When Old Man Logan returns to Earth-21923, Manfredi's house is the first place he stops at. Logan makes work of Manfredi's henchmen before Manfredi surrendered his vehicle. Once Logan has left, he arranges for a henchmen who lost his leg and a henchman who lost his arm to be patched up by Lizard. The group was later visited by Sabretooth.

In other media
A variation of Joseph Manfredi appears in the second season of the live-action Marvel Cinematic Universe television series Agent Carter, portrayed by Ken Marino. Active during the 1940s, this version is the leader of the Maggia's Los Angeles branch, an old acquaintance of Howard Stark, and formerly in a relationship with Whitney Frost. Introduced in the episode "The Atomic Job", Manfredi reunites with Frost, who seeks his help in empowering herself with Zero Matter. Despite their best efforts, they run afoul of Peggy Carter and the Strategic Scientific Reserve, who eventually defeat Frost and Manfredi.

References

External links
 Blackwing (Joseph Manfredi) at Marvel.com
 Blackwing (Joseph Manfredi) at Comic Vine
 Blackwing II at Marvel.com
 

Articles about multiple fictional characters
Characters created by Don Heck
Characters created by Gerry Conway
Comics characters introduced in 1975
Fictional characters from Orlando, Florida
Fictional crime bosses
Fictional Italian American people
Hydra (comics) agents
Marvel Comics male supervillains
Marvel Comics supervillains